Euseius densus is a species of mite in the family Phytoseiidae.

References

densus
Articles created by Qbugbot
Animals described in 1984